The Ministry of Home Affairs (MOHA; , KHEDN) is a cabinet-level ministry in the government of Brunei which is responsible for the country's administrative divisions, municipal areas, immigration, labour, fire and rescue services, prison and rehabilitation institutions, and national disaster management. It was established immediately upon Brunei's independence on 1 January 1984. It is currently led by a minister and the incumbent is Ahmaddin Rahman, who took office since 7 June 2022. The ministry is headquartered in Bandar Seri Begawan.

Organisation 
The ministry oversees the following departments:

Budget 
In the 2022–23 fiscal year, the ministry has been allocated a budget of B$128 million, a 1.5 percent decrease from the previous year.

Ministers 
The ministry is headed by a minister and is a member of the Council of Cabinet Ministers, the cabinet of Brunei. The minister is assisted by a permanent secretary and the latter with two deputy permanent secretaries. The first Minister of Home Affairs was Hassanal Bolkiah, the Sultan of Brunei. In the cabinet reshuffle in 1986, the post was given to Isa Ibrahim, who became the first ordinary citizen to have taken the office.

See also 
 List of government ministries of Brunei
 Ministry of Foreign Affairs and Trade (Brunei)

Notes

References

External links 
  

Home Affairs
Brunei